The 2016 Belarusian Indoor Athletics Championships was the year's national championship in indoor track and field for Belarus. It was held from 19–21 February at the Olympic sports complex in Mogilev.

Results

Men

Women

References

 2016 Belarus Indoor Athletics Championships Results

Belarusian Athletics Championships
Belarusian Indoor Athletics Championships
Belarusian Indoor Athletics Championships
Belarusian Indoor Athletics Championships
Sport in Mogilev
National indoor athletics competitions